The 1950–51 season was the 51st season in the history of Berner Sport Club Young Boys. The team played their home games at Stadion Wankdorf in Bern.

Players
 Walter Eich
 Hans Flühmann
 Werner Zehnder
 Albert Stoll
 Heinz Bigler
 Michel Peney
 Robert Weil
 Hans Grütter
 Otto Häuptli
 Hans Thommen
 Ernst Giacometti

Friendlies

Competitions

Overall record

Nationalliga A

League table

Matches

Swiss Cup

References

BSC Young Boys seasons
Swiss football clubs 1950–51 season